As of September 2021, airBaltic flies to 80 international destinations across the Baltics, Europe, Russia, Caucasus, Middle East and Central Asia. airBaltic also serves multiple charter flights.

List

References

External links
Route Map

Lists of airline destinations